is a Japanese former Nippon Professional Baseball pitcher and manager. He played his entire career with the Chunichi Dragons. In his rookie season, he collected numerous accolades, including the Central League Rookie of the Year Award and the Eiji Sawamura Award.

In 1998, Gondoh became the manager of the Yokohama BayStars and led them to a Japan Series title in his first year.

External links

1938 births
Living people
Baseball people from Saga Prefecture
Japanese Baseball Hall of Fame inductees
Japanese baseball players
Nippon Professional Baseball pitchers
Chunichi Dragons players
Nippon Professional Baseball Rookie of the Year Award winners
Managers of baseball teams in Japan
Yokohama DeNA BayStars managers